Long Live Mexico is the debut studio album by American rapper Lil Keed. It was released on June 14, 2019, by YSL Records and 300 Entertainment. The album features guest appearances from Lil Duke, Gunna, Nav, Young Thug, Guap Tarantino, MSA PG, Moneybagg Yo, Keed's younger brother Lil Gotit, Lil Uzi Vert, YNW Melly, StickBaby, Roddy Ricch, and Karlae. It sold 16,000 in first week sales, with only 300 pure album sales.

Background
The album is his second project after Keed Talk To 'Em, which was released earlier in December 2018.

The project was named "Long Live Mexico" to commemorate and pay homage to Keed's friend Mexico, who lost his life earlier in the year.

Singles
The album contains the singles, "Oh My God", "Proud Of Me", and "Pull Up."

Accolades

Track listing
Credits adapted from Geoff Ogunlesi's Instagram.

Notes
  signifies an uncredited co-producer

Personnel
Credits adapted from Geoff Ogunlesi's Instagram.

 A.L.E.O. – recording 
 Anthony "Dub" Williams – recording 
 A. Bainz – recording 
 Senor Slice – recording 
 Ray Nash – recording 
 Alex Tumay – mixing 
 Joe LaPorta – mastering

Charts

References

2019 albums
Lil Keed albums
Albums produced by Cubeatz
Albums produced by Metro Boomin
YSL Records albums